Irshad Khan (born ) is an Indian classical surbahar and sitar player based in Canada. He is the second son of Imrat Khan and nephew of Vilayat Khan.

Irshad's international debut was at the Queen Elizabeth Hall in London, UK, when he was only 13; he appeared there again on 30 October 2006 in a concert to celebrate the 70th birthday of his father Imrat. At 18, he made history by becoming the youngest soloist to perform at the Indian All Night concert at the Proms.

Irshad Khan is the founder/president of Universal Academy for Musicians, based in Mississauga and Mumbai.

Albums
The Magic of Twilight (2000)

References

External links
 Irshad Khan's website

Sitar players
Etawah gharana
Living people
Year of birth missing (living people)